Ries is the German word for a unit of paper ream, derived from the Arabic word rizma.
The term can refer to:

Geography 

 Nördlinger Ries, a large circular depression in western Bavaria, Germany.
 Ries (Graz), a district of the city of Graz, Austria, named after a hill range in it.

People 

 Adam Ries (1492–1559), German mathematician
 Al Ries, American marketing professional and author
 Charles P. Ries (diplomat) (born 1951), American businessman and diplomat
 Charles P. Ries (poet) (born 1952), American poet and writer
 Christopher Ries (1952–), American glass sculptor
 Eric Ries, American entrepreneur and author
 Ferdinand Ries (1784–1838), German composer
 Franz Ries (1846–1932), German violinist and composer
 Franz Anton Ries (1755–1846), German Musician, Hubert and Ferdinand's Father
 Frédérique Ries (1959–), Belgian politician
 Heinrich Ries (1871–1951), American economic geologist
 Henry Ries (1917–2004), American photographer
 Hubert Ries (1802–1886), German Musician, Franz's Father
 Irving G. Ries (1890–1963), American cinematographer and special effects artist
 István Ries (1885–1950), Hungarian politician
 Jane Silverstein Ries, American landscape architect
 Judit Györgyey Ries, Hungarian astronomer
 Julien Ries, Belgian cardinal
 Justin B. Ries, American marine scientist
 Laura Ries, American businesswoman and author
 Marcie Berman Ries, American foreign service officer
 Merete Ries (1938–2018), Danish publisher and editor
 Nick Ries (1982–), former Australian rules footballer
 Peter Ries, German record producer
 Riesbyfe Stridberg, fictional character often nicknamed as Ries.

Things 

 the Rijnland Internet Election System